Soyasapogenol glucuronosyltransferase (UGASGT) is an enzyme with systematic name UDP-D-glucuronate:soyasapogenol 3-O-D-glucuronosyltransferase. This enzyme catalyses the following chemical reaction

 UDP-glucuronate + soyasapogenol B  UDP + soyasapogenol B 3-O-D-glucuronide

This enzyme requires a divalent ion, Mg2+ or Mn2+, or Ca2+.

References

External links 
 

EC 2.4.1